The Reform Democratic Party of Solomon Islands (RDPSI) is a political party in Solomon Islands. It was founded by MP Danny Philip. Campaigning for the 2010 general election, the party promised constitutional reform in order for the people to be "true owners of the state and its institutions". Philip was elected Prime Minister in August 2010.

References

Political parties in the Solomon Islands